Daniel Aloysius Lord (23 April 1888 – 15 January 1955) was an American Jesuit priest and Catholic writer. He wrote 32 books, 15 booklets, and 228 pamphlets, as well as countless articles. Lord also wrote 70 plays, musicals, and pageants. He served as one of the technical consultants on Cecil B. DeMille's 1927 The King of Kings. His most influential work was possibly in drafting the 1930 Production Code for motion pictures.

Life
Born in Chicago, Illinois, April 23, 1888, Daniel Lord attended local Catholic elementary and after a year at De La Salle Institute attending St. Ignatius College Prep. In 1909, he entered the Society of Jesus at St. Stanislaus Seminary in Florissant, Missouri. Upon completion of his novitiate training at St. Stanislaus, he lived in St. Louis, Missouri. He went on to receive an M.A. in Philosophy from St. Louis University, and taught English there from 1917-1920. He was ordained a priest in 1923.

In April 1924 Lord addressed 400 delegates of the second annual convention of the St. Louis Archdiocese Council of Catholic Women, where he spoke of the Church as an agency for breaking down provincialism.
That same year he gave the Baccalaureate sermon at Webster University in St. Louis. He professed as a member of the Society of Jesus in 1925.

Lord became national director of the Sodality of Our Lady in 1926, also serving as editor of its magazine, The Queen's Work. A loose network of student-based charitable and devotional groups often headquartered at Jesuit educational institutions, it was labeled a dying organization before his involvement, but expanded quickly under Lord's leadership. At the peak in the late 1940s there were 13,000 Sodalities in the United States and Canada at Catholic grade schools, high schools and colleges. Many parishes had both a Women's Sodality and a Men's Sodality.  Lord drafted the Sodality theme song, For Christ the King, known to many mid-century American parochial school children. He also wrote, in 1941, the school song for Ursuline College in Louisville, Kentucky.

Lord stepped down from editorship in 1948, but continued to write for the magazine for the remainder of his life, producing more than 90 books, over 300 pamphlets, and countless articles, plays, and songs. "For a 30-year period in the last century, Rev. Daniel Lord, S.J. preached his down-to-earth spirituality by distributing dozens of pamphlets on family life, children, and marriage directly to the people in parish churches."

Lord also staged musical pageants, among which was the "City of Freedom", held in Detroit in July 1951. He also produced a syndicated weekly column, Along the Way, as well as a regular youth feature for Our Sunday Visitor. He also contributed articles on the theater to the Catholic World.

Hollywood
In 1927, Lord served as one of six technical consultants, of various denominations, to Cecil B. DeMille for his silent film, King of Kings. Lord alone was listed as Technical Advisor in the film credits. He described his time on the set with DeMille in his autobiography Played by Ear. He observed, "just how far vice may be presented in order to make virtue triumphant is one of  the most delicate problems in artistic art."

In 1929, he began work on the Production Code, a project envisioned by censor Martin Quigley, publisher of a Hollywood trade journal, and bolstered by Cardinal George Mundelein of the Archdiocese of Chicago. He saw an opportunity to read morality and decency into mass recreation. He aimed "to tie the Ten Commandments in with the newest and most widespread form of entertainment," aspiring to an ecumenical standard of decency.

In 1930, Lord's draft of the Code was accepted by Will H. Hays and promulgated to the studios with only minor changes, but it lacked an enforcement mechanism, and Lord came to consider it a failure. It was only with the mid-1934 advent of the Production Code Administration headed by Joseph Breen that the Code became the law of Hollywood for more than 25 years.

In the 1930s and 1940s, Lord's writings touched on politics, seeking a Catholic middle ground between socialism and unfettered capitalism. He was a tireless advocate of racial fairness, and frequently engaged issues of economic justice, Dare We Hate Jews was his response to anti-Semitism, attacking it as incompatible with Catholic teachings.

In 1954 Lord was diagnosed with incurable lung cancer.  He died at Saint John's Hospital, St. Louis on 15 January 1955.

Works (partial)

Father Finn, S.J., the story of his life told by himself for his friends young and old (1929)

Books by Lord (Listed chronologically)
A Complete List of Daniel Lord Books
Armchair Philosophy.  New York: America Press, 1918.  (An interesting look at Catholic philosophical thought as taught to Jesuit priests at the time.)
Our Nuns: Their Varied and Vital Service for God and County.  New York: Benziger, 1924.  (A fascinating look at institutions run by Catholic sisters in Chicago and St. Louis.)
Religion and Leadership. Milwaukee: Bruce Publishing, 1933.  (This popular textbook for Catholic college theology courses was used into the 1950s.)
My Mother, The Study of an Uneventful Life  St. Louis: Queen's Work, 1934.  (The famous movie producer John W. Considine Jr. (e.g. Boys Town) considered making a movie of this book.)
Questions I'm Asked About Marriage  St. Louis: Queen's Work, 1938.  (Based on questions raised at Lord's frequent lectures, talks, and retreats.)
 Played by Ear, Chicago, Loyola Univ. Press, 1956.

Pamphlets
A Complete List of Daniel Lord Pamphlets
 I can read ANYTHING!? All right! - then read THIS!, 1932)
 Confession is a Joy? (1933)
 Fashionable Sin - A Modern Discussion of an Unpopular Subject (1934)
 Pardon My Manners, The Queen's Work / Sodality Movment (1935)

Other pamphlets include: "You can't live that way", The Call to Catholic Action,
 and Our Part in the Mystical Body.

Novels
 Red Arrows in the Night (1943)

Notes

Further reading
Werner, Stephen A., The Restless Flame, Daniel Lord, S.J.: Thinking Big in a Parochial World (Press, Press, Pull - St. Louis, 2021). This is a comprehensive biography on Lord.
Werner, Stephen A., “Daniel Lord, SJ, the Restless Flame: Supporting Catholic Families,” College Theology Society Annual Volume 66 (2020),48-58. 
Werner, Stephen A., “Daniel A. Lord, SJ: A Forgotten Catholic Dynamo of the Early Twentieth Century,” American Catholic Studies 129 (Summer 2018): 39-58.
Werner, Stephen A., “‘The Birth of a Nation’ sparked decades of racial violence. This Jesuit understood its unholy power.” America, 224, No. 2 (February 19, 2021).
Werner, Stephen A., "What Men Astutely Trained Got Wrong: Rescuing Daniel Lord, S.J., and Joseph Husslein, S.J., from Peter McDonough’s 'Hatchet Job'" St. Louis Cultural History Project (Fall 2021)
Werner, Stephen A., “Daniel Lord, S.J.: Booster for the American Nun,” St. Louis Cultural History Project (Spring 2022).
 Lord, Daniel A., Played By Ear: The Autobiography of Daniel A. Lord, S. J. (Loyola University Press, 1955). 
 Lord, Daniel A., When Sorrow Comes - Reflections on the Problem of Pain and the Mystery of Suffering and Sorrow, (The Queen's Work, 1935)
 Lord, D.A., Revolt against Heaven   (The Queen's Work, 1936)
Lord, D.A., Forever and Forever   (The Queen's Work, 1936)

External links
 Father Lord's vinyl LP featured on The Generation Exploitation Podcast
  A eulogy
 A history of Hays and the Code, with quotes from Fr. Lord (requires subscription)
 
 For Christ the King

1888 births
1955 deaths
20th-century American Jesuits
Writers from Chicago